The Eklund TE-1 was a Finnish-built single-seat flying boat of the late 1940s.

Design and development
The TE-1 was designed in late 1948 by Torolf Eklund, who was a Finnish aircraft designer for Valtion Lentokonetehdas between 1935 and 1962. The TE-1 was financed and built by Eklund as a private venture.

Operational history
The TE-1 first flew in February 1949 powered by a 28 h.p. Poinsard engine. This powerplant suffered a crankcase failure, and as spare parts were no longer available, it was replaced by a Continental A40-5 engine. At the time of its first flight, the TE-1 was claimed to be the world's smallest flying boat. The aircraft last flew in 1969. It is now preserved in the Suomen Ilmailumuseo (Finnish Aviation Museum) at Helsinki Vantaa airport.

Variants
The following proposed derivatives were developed, but only the prototype TE-1 was completed and flown.

TE-1A with retractable four-wheel undercarriage
TE-1B flying boat configuration
TE-1B-S flying boat with skis
TE-1B-G flying boat with breaching gear

Specifications (TE-1)

See also

References

TE-1
1940s Finnish sport aircraft
Flying boats
High-wing aircraft
Single-engined tractor aircraft
Aircraft first flown in 1949